The 2012 ICC World Cricket League Africa Region Twenty20 Division Three Is a cricket tournament that took place between 25 and 30 April 2012. South Africa hosted the event, with Zambia winning it.

Teams
Teams that participated are as follows:

Squads

Fixtures

Group stage

Points Table

Matches

Play-offs

7th place play-off

5th place play-off

3rd place play-off

Final

Final Placings

After the conclusion of the tournament the teams were distributed as follows:

See also

2012 ICC World Twenty20 Qualifier
World Cricket League Africa Region

References

2014 ICC World Twenty20